Leptodactylus furnarius is a species of frogs in the family Leptodactylidae. It is found in Brazil and Uruguay. Its natural habitats are moist savanna, subtropical or tropical moist shrubland, subtropical or tropical high-altitude shrubland, subtropical or tropical seasonally wet or flooded lowland grassland, freshwater marshes, intermittent freshwater marshes, pastureland, plantations, rural gardens, and ponds. It is threatened by habitat loss.

References

furnarius
Amphibians described in 1978
Taxonomy articles created by Polbot